Rudsar or Rud Sar (also Romanized as Rūd Sar and Rud-Sar; also known as  Rūdsar-e Tāzehābād and Rūdsar Tāzehābād) is a village in Gil Dulab Rural District, in the Central District of Rezvanshahr County, Gilan Province, Iran. At the 2006 census, its population was 311, in 101 families.

References 

Populated places in Rezvanshahr County